The 2020 Leagues Cup was planned to be the second edition of the Leagues Cup organized by Major League Soccer and the Mexican Football Federation. The tournament would have featured 16 teams, an increase from the inaugural edition that had eight teams. Unlike the previous tournament, teams would have qualified based on league performance rather than by invitation.

Major League Soccer announced the cancelation of the tournament on May 19, 2020, due to the ongoing COVID-19 pandemic.

Qualification
The top four Major League Soccer teams from each conference in the 2019 season who did not qualify for the 2020 CONCACAF Champions League would have qualified for the Leagues Cup.

The 2019 Apertura, 2020 Clausura, and 2019–20 Copa MX champions would have qualified for the Leagues Cup, plus the top five teams from the combined 2019–20 Liga MX standings who had not already qualified.

Draw

The 2020 edition of the Leagues Cup was planned to be the first to use a draw and seeding for participating teams. The initial draw would have matched up an MLS team against a Liga MX team in the Round of 16, while a second draw before the quarterfinals would have allowed for reseeding and adjustments to allow for interleague play.

Fixtures

Round of 16

Quarterfinals and beyond
The schedule for the final rounds of the tournament was originally as follows:

 Quarterfinals: August 4–5
 Semifinals: August 25–26
 Final: September 16

References

2020
2020 in American soccer
2020 in Canadian soccer
2020–21 in Mexican football
Leagues Cup